Real Gone Cat is a 2006 film directed by Robert Sucato and starring Dennis Rowland and Scott Hopkins. The film was an official selection of both the Sedona Film Festival and the Phoenix Film Festival.  Hopkins wrote and starred in the film with Rowland.

Cast
 Dennis Rowland as Jimmy Baker
 Scott Hopkins as Picasso
 Tracy Sucato as Darlene
 Jesse McGuire as Ziggy Charles
 Mark Gluckman as Nick
 Gary Imel as Peter
 James Forsmo as Man at bar

Crew
 Director - Robert Sucato
 Writer - Scott Hopkins
 Producer - Robert Sucato and Scott Hopkins
 Director of photography - Steve Wargo
 Sound editor - Danny Coltrane

Film Festivals
 2006 Sedona Film Festival
 2006 Phoenix Film Festival
 2006 San Tan Short Film Festival
 2007 Kansas City Filmmakers Jubilee (Kansas City FilmFest)

External links

2006 films
2000s English-language films
American drama short films
2000s American films